The Rainy Season is the second studio album by American singer-songwriter Marc Cohn, released in 1993. The album peaked at number 63 on the Billboard 200 chart and at number 24 on the UK charts.

Track listing
All tracks written by Marc Cohn, except where noted.

Personnel 
Adapted from the album's liner notes.
 Marc Cohn – lead vocals, acoustic piano (1, 3, 7, 10), acoustic guitar (2, 4, 5, 6, 8), melodica (7), electric piano (11), keyboards (11)
 Benmont Tench – Hammond organ (1, 2, 8), acoustic piano (2, 6), Wurlitzer electric piano (8)
 John Leventhal – guitar (1, 5, 10), electric guitar (2, 3, 6, 8), bouzouki (2, 5), mandolin (2, 4), Hammond organ (3, 6, 7, 11), keyboards (4, 5, 8, 11), slide guitar (4), bass (5, 7), percussion (5, 7, 8), harmonica (6), acoustic guitar (7), Wurlitzer electric piano (9), nylon string guitar (11)
 Bonnie Raitt – slide guitar (3), lead and harmony vocals (3)
 Larry Campbell – pedal steel guitar (7), violin (7)
 James "Hutch" Hutchinson – bass (1, 2, 3, 6, 8)
 Zev Katz – upright bass (10)
 Jim Keltner – drums (1, 2, 3, 6, 8, 9)
 Dennis McDermott – drums (5)
 Mike Mainieri – marimbas (4), vibraphone (4)
 Mino Cinélu – udu (4), percussion (8)
 Arto Tuncboyaciyan – percussion (10)
 Glen Velez – percussion (10)
 Jack Bashkow – baritone saxophone (1, 3)
 Adam Kolker – baritone saxophone (2, 10)
 Rick Depofi – tenor saxophone (1, 2, 3, 10), horn arrangements (1)
 Aaron Heick – tenor saxophone (1)
 Bob Malach – tenor saxophone (3)
 Larry Farrell – trombone (1, 3)
 Chris Botti – trumpet (3)
 Wardell Quezergue – horn arrangements (3)
 Catherine Russell – backing vocals (1, 3)
 Ada Dyer – backing vocals (3)
 Diva Gray – backing vocals (3)
 Sweet Pea Atkinson – backing vocals (6, 9)
 Harry Bowens – backing vocals (6, 9)
 Terry Evans – backing vocals (6, 9)
 Arnold McCuller – backing vocals (6, 9)
 David Crosby – harmony vocals (7, 10)
 Graham Nash – harmony vocals (7, 10)
 David Hidalgo – harmony vocals (8)
 Willie Greene, Jr. – backing vocals (9)

Production 
 Marc Cohn – producer
 John Leventhal – producer 
 Ben Wisch – producer, recording, mixing 
 Dave Hecht – assistant engineer 
 Matt Knobel – assistant engineer 
 Ted Jensen – mastering 
 Sterling Sound (New York, NY) – mastering location 
 Jill Dell'Abate – production coordinator 
 Richard Bates – art direction, design  
 Melodie McDaniel – photography 
 David Spagnolo – photography

References

1993 albums
Marc Cohn albums
Albums produced by John Leventhal
Atlantic Records albums